Efferia aestuans is a species of insect in the family Asilidae, the robber flies. It is native to eastern North America, where it ranges from Ontario and New Hampshire south into Florida and New Mexico. It was originally described as Asilus aestuans in Carl Linnaeus' 1763 work Centuria Insectorum.

It reaches a body length of 18 mm in males and 23 mm in females.

References

External links

Asilinae
Diptera of North America
Insects described in 1763
Taxa named by Carl Linnaeus